Rodrigo Romero (born 8 October 1982) is a Paraguayan footballer that plays as a goalkeeper. He was part of the silver medal-winning Paraguayan 2004 Olympic football team.

Club
2002 General Caballero ZC
2002–2003 Sportivo Trinidense
2003–2004 Nacional Asunción
2005 Sport Colombia
2005 Cúcuta Deportivo
2005–2006 Nacional Asunción
2006–2007 Sportivo Trinidense
2008 Olimpia Asunción
2008 3 de Febrero
2009 Club Deportivo Universidad de Concepcion
2016 Club Deportivo Técnico Universitario

International career
On 4 August, before the Summer Olympics began, he played in a preparation game against the Portugal of Cristiano Ronaldo in the city of Algarve, resulting in a 5–0 defeat.

References

External links
 Rodrigo Romero at BDFA.com.ar 

1982 births
Living people
Paraguayan footballers
Club Nacional footballers
Club Olimpia footballers
Olympic footballers of Paraguay
Olympic silver medalists for Paraguay
Footballers at the 2004 Summer Olympics
Association football goalkeepers
Olympic medalists in football
Medalists at the 2004 Summer Olympics